Matula (Czech feminine: Matulová) is a surname. It may refer to: 
David Matula (born 1937), American mathematician and computer scientist;
Iosif Matula (born 1958), Romanian engineer and politician;
Kim Matula (born 1988), American actress;
Milan Matula (born 1984), Czech footballer;
Rick Matula (born 1953), American baseball player;
, Philippine lawyer and labor leader;
Vili Matula (born 1962), Croatian actor;
Vlasta Matulová (1918–1989), Czech actress.

See also